Warji (Warjawa) or Sirzakwai is an Afro-Asiatic language spoken in Bauchi State, Nigeria.  Speakers are shifting to Hausa.

Distribution
Warji is spoken in:

Ganjuwa district, Darazo LGA, Bauchi State
Warji district, Ningi LGA, Bauchi State
Birnin Kudu LGA, Jigawa State

Morphology
Within the Bade–Warji languages, Warji has the most complex nominal plural marking system. Plurals are marked by the following suffixes.

-tsǝ
-sA (-sǝ, -sa)
-Aŋsǝ (-ǝŋsǝ, -aŋsǝ)
-(aŋ)ʃi (-shi, -aŋshi; stem-final -i is assimilated)

These may be all allomorphs of a single suffix, with optional inserted nasals.

Suppletive nominal plurals are:

Notes 

Languages of Nigeria
West Chadic languages